Everett McDonald  (born c. 1958) is a Canadian politician who was an elected member to the Legislative Assembly of Alberta representing the electoral district of Grande Prairie-Smoky from 2012 to 2015. He formerly served as the Reeve of the County of Grande Prairie.

Electoral history

2015 general election

2012 general election

References

Living people
Farmers from Alberta
People from Grande Prairie
Progressive Conservative Association of Alberta MLAs
1950s births
Year of birth uncertain
Members of the Executive Council of Alberta
21st-century Canadian politicians